Ole Julian Bjørgvik Holm (born 23 May 2002) is a Norwegian ice hockey player for the Mississauga Steelheads of the Ontario Hockey League. Internationally he has played for the Norwegian national team at the 2021 World Championships.

He was drafted 145th overall in the 2020 NHL Entry Draft by the Columbus Blue Jackets and signed an entry-level contract on 16 August 2021.

Holm played 6 games at the 2021 World Championships.

References

External links
 

2002 births
Living people
Cleveland Monsters players
Columbus Blue Jackets draft picks
Expatriate ice hockey players in Canada
Expatriate ice hockey players in the United States
Manglerud Star Ishockey players
Mississauga Steelheads players
Norwegian expatriate ice hockey people
Norwegian expatriate sportspeople in Canada
Norwegian expatriate sportspeople in the United States
Norwegian ice hockey defencemen
Ice hockey people from Oslo
Tri-City Storm players